General elections were held in Niue on 7 April 1990, seven months after Cyclone Ofa caused considerable damage to the island. While primarily contested by independents, the election was contested by Young Vivian's Niue People's Action Party (NPAP), which was opposed to premier Robert Rex. On election night the NPAP believed it had a majority, but a leadership dispute between Vivian and newly-elected MP Sani Lakatani saw a group of MP's led by the latter switch sides.

Following the election, Robert Rex was re-elected for a sixth term as Premier of Niue by a vote of 12 to 8.  Sam Tagelagi was re-elected Speaker by the same margin.

References

Elections in Niue
Niue
1990 in Niue
April 1990 events in Oceania